Situationalism may refer to:
 Situational ethics 
Situationist International
Situationism (psychology)